Cornelius Nepos (c. 110 BC – c. 25 BC) was a Roman biographer. He was born at Hostilia, a village in Cisalpine Gaul not far from Verona.

Biography
Nepos's Cisalpine birth is attested by Ausonius, and Pliny the Elder calls him Padi accola ("a dweller on the River Po", Naturalis historia III.127). He was a friend of Catullus, who dedicates his poems to him (I.3), Cicero and Titus Pomponius Atticus. Eusebius places him in the fourth year of the reign of Augustus, which is supposed to be when he began to attract critical acclaim by his writing. Pliny the Elder notes he died in the reign of Augustus (Natural History IX.39, X.23).

Works

De viris illustribus

Nepos' De viris illustribus consisted of parallel lives of distinguished Romans and foreigners, in sixteen books. It originally included "descriptions of foreign and Roman kings, generals, lawyers, orators, poets, historians, and philosophers".

 Miltiades
 Themistocles
 Aristides
 Pausanias
 Cimon
 Lysander
 Alcibiades
 Thrasybulus
 Conon
 Dion
 Iphicrates
 Chabrias
 Timotheus
 Datames
 Epaminondas
 Pelopidas
 Agesilaus
 Eumenes
 Phocion
 Timoleon
 On Kings
 Hamilcar
 Hannibal

Two additional lives survive from elsewhere in the De viris illustribus:

 Cato
 Atticus

The Excellentium imperatorum vitae appeared in the reign of Theodosius I, as the work of the grammarian Aemilius Probus, who presented it to the emperor with a dedication in Latin verse.  He claims it to have been the work of his mother or father (the manuscripts vary) and his grandfather. Despite the obvious questions (such as why the preface addressed to someone named Atticus when the work was supposedly dedicated to Theodosius), no one seemed to have doubted Probus's authorship. Eventually Peter Cornerus discovered in a manuscript of Cicero's letters the biographies of Cato and Atticus. He added them to the other existing biographies, despite the fact that the writer speaks of himself as a contemporary and friend of Atticus, and that the manuscript bore the heading E libro posteriore Cornelii Nepotis ('from the last book of Cornelius Nepos'). At last Dionysius Lambinus's edition of 1569 bore a commentary demonstrating on stylistic grounds that the work must have been of Nepos alone, and not Aemilius Probus. This view has been tempered by more recent scholarship, which agrees with Lambinus that they are the work of Nepos, but that Probus probably abridged the biographies when he added the verse dedication. The Life of Atticus, however, is considered to be the exclusive composition of Nepos.

Other works

Nearly all of Nepos' other writings are lost, but several allusions to them survive in works by other authors. Aulus Gellius' Attic Nights are of special importance in this respect.

 Chronica, an epitome of universal history; Catullus seems to allude to the "Chronica" in his dedication to Nepos.  Ausonius also mentions it in his sixteenth Epistle to Probus, as does Aulus Gellius in the Noctes Atticae (XVII.21).  "Probably a chronological summary which included the history of outside nations as well as of Rome," it is thought to have been written in three books.

 Exempla, a collection of anecdotes after the style of Valerius Maximus; Exemplorum libri, of which Charisius cites the second book, and Aulus Gellius the fifth (VI.18, 19). The book likely contained "models for imitation, drawn from the early Romans, whose simplicity contrasted with the luxury" of Nepos' era."

 letters to Cicero; De Vita Ciceronis. Aulus Gellius corrects an error in this work (XV.28). The book is thought to have been written after the death of the consul, statesman and orator Cicero. According to Roberts, "his friendship for Cicero and Atticus and his access to their correspondence would have made the work an especially valuable one for us."

 lives of Cato the elder; A complete biography of Cato the Censor, from which Aulus Gellius draws an anecdote of Cato (XI.8).

 Epistulae ad Ciceronem, an extract of which survives in Lactantius (Divinarum Institutionum Libri Septem III.15). It is unclear whether they were ever formally published.

Pliny the Younger mentions verse written by Nepos, and in his own Life of Dion, Nepos himself refers to a work of his own authorship, De Historicis. If a separate work, this would be from a hypothesized De Historicis Latinis, only one book in the larger De Viris Illustribus (see above), although exclusively comprising biographies of Romans. Pliny also mentions a longer Life of Cato at the end of the extant Life of Cato, written at the request of Titus Pomponius Atticus, the "complete biography" now lost.

In popular culture

While the historical Cornelius Nepos does not appear in fiction, his name is used by the German Romantic author, Achim von Arnim, as the name of one of his characters in his novella, Isabella von Ägypten (Isabella of Egypt). Contrary to the historical Cornelius, who has been thought of as a writer of simple, less elegant prose, as evidenced through his writing, this Cornelius is a Mandrake, a root creature created from a hangman's tears, and dug up on a dark night at 11 at night, who is a treasure finder, desiring to become more important than what he is. Desiring to be a Field Marshal in the Holy Roman Empire, Cornelius serves the title character, Isabella, helping her by digging up treasures for them, while rejecting the very notion of being considered a Mandrake in society.

An analogy to historical contexts, Arnim names the mandrake Cornelius Nepos, in an effort to implement what Tzvetan Todorov calls "the fantastic", a genre that sets what is real against what is imaginary or supernatural; to transmit to society that life is not as simple as we make it out to be. Here, Nepos is used to convey that idea, that when the real Nepos is set against that of the supernatural mandrake, the reader and society at large, can not be certain as to which is the real and which is the imaginary, a microcosm of the "uneasy conscience of the nineteenth century."

References

Citations

Further reading
 Bradley, J. R. The Sources of Cornelius Nepos : Selected Lives. New York: Garland Pub., 1991.
Conte, Gian Biagio. Latin Literature: a History (trans: Solodow, Joseph B.). Baltimore. 1994. esp. pp. 221–3.
 Geiger, M. J. Cornelius Nepos and Ancient Political Biography. Stuttgart: Steiner Verlag Wiesbaden, 1985.
 Hägg, T. The Art of Biography in Antiquity. Cambridge: Cambridge University Press, 2012.
 Lobur, John Alexander. Cornelius Nepos: A Study in the Evidence and Influence. Ann Arbor: University of Michigan Press, 2021.
 Lindsay, H. “The Biography of Atticus : Cornelius Nepos on the Philosophical and Ethical Background of Pomponius Atticus.” Latomus, vol. 57, no. 2, 1998, pp. 324–336.
 Lord, L. E. “The Biographical Interests of Nepos.” The Classical Journal, vol. 22, no. 7, 1927, pp. 498–503.
Malcovati, Enrica. Quae exstant (G.B. Paravia, 1944). Includes a summary of all references to Nepos' lost works ("Deperditorum librorum reliquiae", pp. 177–206).
 Marshall, P. K. The Manuscript Tradition of Cornelius Nepos. London: Institute of Classical Studies, 1977.
 Millar, F. “Cornelius Nepos, 'Atticus' and the Roman Revolution.” Greece & Rome, vol. 35, no. 1, 1988, pp. 40–55. 
Peck, Harry Thurston: "Nepos" (Harper's Dictionary of Classical Antiquities, 1898).
Pryzwansky, M. M. “Cornelius Nepos: Key Issues and Critical Approaches.” The Classical Journal, vol. 105, no. 2, 2010, pp. 97–108.
Roberts, Arthur W. Selected Lives from Cornelius Nepos. Boston: Ginn & Company, 1895.
 Stem, S. R. The Political Biographies of Cornelius Nepos.   Ann Arbor:  University of Michigan Press, 2012.
 Titchener, Frances. “Cornelius Nepos and the Biographical Tradition.” Greece & Rome, vol. 50, no. 1, 2003, pp. 85–99. 
Watson, Rev. John Selby. Justin, Cornelius Nepos, and Eutropius: Literally Translated, with Notes and a General Index. Henry G. Bohn, London 1853.

External links

Works by Cornelius Nepos at Perseus Digital Library
Dickinson College Commentaries: Life of Hannibal
Works of Nepos, in Latin, at the Latin Library
Cornelius Nepos at tertullian.org (Rev. John Selby Watson's translation of the Lives, with preface and translation of the fragments by Roger Pearse)

Golden Age Latin writers
Roman-era biographers
Cornelii
2nd-century BC Romans
1st-century BC Romans
1st-century BC writers
110s BC births
20s BC deaths
Year of birth uncertain